43rd Brigade may refer to:

 43rd Indian Brigade of the First World War
 43rd Independent Gurkha Infantry Brigade of the Second World War
 43rd Heavy Artillery Brigade (Ukraine)
 43rd Mechanized Brigade (Netherlands)
 43rd Military Police Brigade (United States)
 43rd Sustainment Brigade (United States)

 United Kingdom
 43rd Infantry Brigade (United Kingdom)
 Artillery Brigades
 43rd (Howitzer) Brigade Royal Field Artillery

See also
 43rd Division (disambiguation)
 43rd Group (disambiguation)
 43rd Regiment (disambiguation)
 43rd Battalion (disambiguation)
 43rd Squadron (disambiguation)